Charles Carl Hans Hansen (23 April 1891, date of death unknown) was a Danish road racing cyclist who competed in the 1912 Summer Olympics. He was born in Copenhagen.

In 1912 he was a member of the Danish cycling team which finished eighth in the team time trial event. In the individual time trial competition he finished 32nd.

References

1891 births
Year of death missing
Danish male cyclists
Olympic cyclists of Denmark
Cyclists at the 1912 Summer Olympics
Cyclists from Copenhagen